Fernando Velasco may refer to:

 Fernando Velasco (American football) (born 1985), American football center
 Fernando Velasco (politician), Spanish politician, former Secretary General of Young Patriots (Basque Country)
 Fernando Velasco Gutiérrez (born 1964), Colombian football manager
 Fernando Velasco Salazar (born 1985), Spanish football (soccer) player known as Fernando Velasco